A fishery is an area with an associated fish or aquatic population which is harvested for its commercial value. Fisheries can be wild or farmed. Most of the world's wild fisheries are in the ocean. This article is an overview of ocean fisheries.

Statistics
Oceans occupy 71 percent of the Earth's surface. They are divided into five major oceans, which in decreasing order of size are: the Pacific Ocean, Atlantic Ocean, Indian Ocean, Southern Ocean, and Arctic Ocean. Over 70 percent of the world catch from the sea comes from the Pacific Ocean.

Pacific Ocean

Atlantic Ocean

Indian Ocean

Southern Ocean

Arctic Ocean

See also
 Wild fisheries
 World fish production
 Fishing by country
 List of harvested aquatic animals by weight
 Population dynamics of fisheries

Notes

References
 World Ocean Atlas (2005) World ocean databasee. Retrieved 19 April 2008.
 The Columbia Electronic Encyclopedia (2007) The World Ocean. Retrieved 19 April 2008.
 Jacques, Peter (2006) Globalization and the world ocean Rowman Altamira. 
 Eakins, B.W. and G.F. Sharman (2010) "Volumes of the World's Oceans from ETOPO1" NOAA National Geophysical Data Center, Boulder, CO.

Fishing industry
Oceans